Benoît Zwierzchiewski (born August 19, 1976, in Mouscron, Belgium) is a male long-distance runner from France who mainly competed in the marathon race during his career. He set his personal best (2:06:36) in the classic distance on April 6, 2003, in Paris, France, equalling the European record set by Portugal's António Pinto at the 2000 edition of the London Marathon. Zwierzchiewski set the course record at the Las Vegas Half marathon on February 9th, 1997 besting the hour mark, recording a world class 59:53 which was then ten seconds from Moses Tanui's world's best time.

Achievements

References

marathoninfo

1976 births
Living people
People from Mouscron
French male long-distance runners
French male marathon runners
French people of Polish descent
Paris Marathon male winners
World Athletics Championships athletes for France